"Curtain Call" is a single by English singer-songwriter Aiden Grimshaw. The song was written by Grimshaw, Jarrad Rogers and Steve Rushton. It was released on 13 August 2012 via RCA Records. It was released as the second single from Grimshaw's debut album Misty Eye. The song features vocals from Labrinth's sister ShezAr.

Music video
A music video to accompany the release of "Curtain Call" was first released onto YouTube on 11 July 2012 at a total length of three minutes and fifty-nine seconds.

Critical reception
Robert Copsey of Digital Spy gave the song a positive review, stating:

'Curtain Call' opens with similar intensity levels to his previous track, laying his heart on the line over a backdrop of cooing strings as he asks his gal to "lose control with me tonight" with alcohol-infused numbness. Fortunately, his acuteness is countered by an epic, lighter-waving chorus that soars majestically with the aid of Labrinth's sister Sherelle. The result, like a generous dose of morphine, will draw a smile every time. .

Track listing

Chart performance

Release history

References

2012 singles
Aiden Grimshaw songs
Pop ballads
Soul ballads
Songs written by Jarrad Rogers
2012 songs
RCA Records singles
Songs written by Steve Rushton